Hilde Vogt (born 3 November 1945) is a Norwegian politician for the Socialist Left Party. She was Party Secretary of the Socialist Left Party from 1985 to 1989.

She served as a deputy representative to the Norwegian Parliament from Hedmark during the term 1985–1989 and 1993–1997.

References

1945 births
Living people
Deputy members of the Storting
Socialist Left Party (Norway) politicians
Hedmark politicians